Economy of Ireland may refer to:

Economy of the Republic of Ireland, the economy of a sovereign state in Europe
Economy of Northern Ireland, the economy of a part of the United Kingdom